United Nations Security Council Resolution 1800 was unanimously adopted on 20 February 2008.

Resolution 
In order to enable the International Criminal Tribunal for the Former Yugoslavia to conduct additional trials as soon as possible and meet its completion strategy, the Security Council today gave the green light for the appointment of more ad litem judges than the 12 provided for in the court’s statute.

Unanimously adopting resolution 1800 (2008) and acting under Chapter VII of the United nations Charter, the Council decided that the Secretary-General may appoint, within existing resources, additional ad litem judges to the Tribunal, notwithstanding the fact that the total number of ad litem judges appointed to the Chambers would, from time to time, temporarily exceed the maximum of 12 provided for in the Tribunal’s statute.  The total number should not exceed 16 at any one time, returning to a maximum of 12 by 31 December 2008.

See also 
List of United Nations Security Council Resolutions 1701 to 1800 (2006–2008)

References

External links
Text of the Resolution at undocs.org

 1800
February 2008 events